High Society is a 2018 South Korean drama film directed by Byun Hyuk. It stars Park Hae-il and Soo Ae. The film was released in South Korea on August 29, 2018.

Plot
The story of a married couple who is at the upper end of the social ladder. The husband is a professor at the Seoul National University who is running for the National Assembly, and his wife is the deputy director of and a curator at a big art gallery.

Cast
 Park Hae-il as Jang Tae-joon
 Soo Ae as Oh Soo-yeon
 Yoon Je-moon as Han Yong-suk
 Ra Mi-ran  as Lee Hwa-ran 
 Lee Jin-wook as Shin Ji-ho
 Han Joo-young
 Kim Kyu-sun  
 Park Joo-hee as Reporter Yoon
 Park Sung-hoon
 Kim Kang-woo (special appearance) as Baek Kwang-hyun
 Lee Hong-nae as an Intern.
 Mao Hamasaki as Minami Oshima.

Production 
Principal photography began on November 1, 2017. Production ended on January 11, 2018.

Reception 
The film was released on August 29, 2018 in South Korea, showing at 867 screens across the country. During its opening day, the film finished second, trailing behind On Your Wedding Day by attracting 131,802 moviegoers with  gross. It became the domestic R-rated film with the biggest opening day for 2018. However, the film dropped to third place during the weekend, finishing behind On Your Wedding Day and new release of the week Searching by attracting 291,228 moviegoers with  gross.

As of September 10, 2018, the film attracted 766,031 total admission with  gross.

References

External links
 
 
 High Society at Naver

2018 films
2010s Korean-language films
Lotte Entertainment films
South Korean drama films
2018 drama films
2010s South Korean films
Films directed by Byun Hyuk